Bifora may refer to:
Bifora, a traditional Sicilian double-reed wind instrument
Bifora (plant), a genus of flowering plant
Bifora (architecture), the Italian term for a mullioned window with two lights